The following Union Army units and commanders fought in the Battle of Belmont of the American Civil War. The Confederate order of battle is listed separately.

Abbreviations used

Military Rank
 BG = Brigadier General
 Col = Colonel
 Ltc = Lieutenant Colonel
 Cpt = Captain
 Lt = 1st Lieutenant

Union Forces

Grant's Expeditionary Command, District of Southeast Missouri
BG Ulysses S. Grant

Units subject to Grant's command

From Paducah, Kentucky
BG Charles Ferguson Smith

Cooperating unit not subject to Grant's command, from Ironton to St. Francis River
 38th Illinois: Col William P. Carlin

See also

 Missouri in the American Civil War
 Kentucky in the American Civil War

References
 Hughes, Nathaniel Cheairs. The Battle of Belmont:  Grant Strikes South (Chapel Hill, NC:  The University of North Carolina Press), 1991.  

American Civil War orders of battle